Federico Guerra (born 15 July 1990) is an Argentine professional footballer who plays as a midfielder for Ciudad de Bolívar.

Career
Independiente Rivadavia were Guerra's first club. After being an unused substitute for a Primera B Nacional fixture with Instituto on 18 June 2011, he made his senior bow in the Copa Argentina against Aldosivi on 22 November. A first professional league appearance arrived at the end of the month versus Instituto, which ended up being the first of eighty-five appearances in the league for them up until December 2014; goals also occurred in matches with Douglas Haig and Crucero del Norte. On 31 March 2015, Guerra dropped down to Primera B Metropolitana to play for Sportivo Italiano. He scored four times in thirty-one games.

Having suffered relegation with Sportivo Italiano, Guerra left to join Atlanta in January 2016. His spell with them lasted two seasons in the third tier, he participated in thirty-seven matches as the club secured back-to-back top three finishes. September 2017 saw Guerra complete a move back to Independiente Rivadavia. His first appearance came in Primera B Nacional versus Guillermo Brown on 10 November.

Career statistics
.

References

External links

1990 births
Living people
Sportspeople from Mendoza, Argentina
Argentine footballers
Association football midfielders
Primera Nacional players
Primera B Metropolitana players
Independiente Rivadavia footballers
Sportivo Italiano footballers
Club Atlético Atlanta footballers
CSyD Tristán Suárez footballers
Juventud Unida Universitario players